Johann Friedrich Jaennicke (7 January 1831 in Frankfurt a. M. – 1 April 1907 in Mainz) was a German "Regierungsrat" and entomologist mainly interested in Diptera.

Works
As Jaennicke, F. (note The author's full initials are J.F.) 1867. Neue exotische Dipteren. Abh. Senckenberg. Naturforsch. Ges. 6: 311–407. (November) 
This was reprinted, 1868, as "Neue exotische Dipteren aus den Museen zu Frankfurt a. M. und Darmstadt," 99 p.

Collection
Jaennicke's collection is in Senckenberg Museum

References
 Geller-Grimm, F. (1999): Raubfliegen-Typen des Senckenberg-Museums in Frankfurt am Main, das überwiegend von Wiedemann und Jaennicke bearbeitet wurde (Insecta, Diptera, Asilidae). Senckenbergiana biol., 78: 205–217; Frankfurt a.M.

External links
 
Portrait and References

German entomologists
Dipterists
1831 births
1907 deaths